Radimov is a village and municipality in Skalica District in the Trnava Region of western Slovakia.

History 
In historical records the village was first mentioned in 1392.

Geography 
The municipality lies at an altitude of 254 metres and covers an area of 12.915 km². It has a population of about 576 people.

References

External links 

 Official page
 http://www.statistics.sk/mosmis/eng/run.html

Villages and municipalities in Skalica District